Calkins is a ghost town in Meagher County, in the U.S. state of Montana.

History
A post office was established in Calkins in 1915, and remained in operation until it was discontinued in 1930. The town was named for R. M. Calkins, a railroad official.

References

Geography of Meagher County, Montana
Ghost towns in Montana